Robert Lewis Hinkle (born November 7, 1951) is a senior United States district judge of the United States District Court for the Northern District of Florida.

Biography

Born on November 7, 1951, in Apalachicola, Florida, Hinkle received a Bachelor of Arts degree from Florida State University in 1972 and a Juris Doctor from Harvard Law School in 1976. He was a law clerk for Judge Irving Goldberg, United States Court of Appeals for the Fifth Circuit from 1976 to 1977. From 1977 to 1978, he was in private practice in Atlanta, Georgia, then practiced in Tallahassee, Florida from 1978 to 1996. He became an adjunct professor of law at Florida State University in 1981.

Federal judicial service

Hinkle was nominated by President Bill Clinton on June 6, 1996, to a seat vacated by William H. Stafford, Jr. of the United States District Court for the Northern District of Florida. He was confirmed by the United States Senate on July 25, 1996, and received his commission on August 1, 1996. He served as chief judge from 2004 to 2009. He took senior status on November 7, 2016.

Notable rulings

On August 21, 2014, Hinkle issued a ruling in Brenner v. Scott that denied the state defendants' motion to dismiss and granted the same-sex couple plaintiffs' motion for a preliminary injunction. In ordering the injunction, Judge Hinkle found that Florida's statutory and constitutional bans on same-sex marriage were federally unconstitutional.

Hinkle heard the case 
Jones et al v. DeSantis which concerned a Florida law, SB 7066, which “required
felons to pay legal fees as part of their sentences before
regaining the vote”.
On May 24, 2020, he ruled that the law
was “unconstitutional for those unable to pay, or
unable to find out how much they owe”.
Hinkle's decision was overturned and the requirement found constitutional by the 11th Circuit Court of Appeals.

In June 2021, Judge Hinkle preliminarily enjoined a Senate Bill 7072, which levies fines and imposes additional penalties against social media platforms that blocked or otherwise inhibited content from political candidates and media organizations.

References

Sources

|-

1951 births
20th-century American judges
21st-century American judges
Florida State University alumni
Harvard Law School alumni
Judges of the United States District Court for the Northern District of Florida
Living people
People from Apalachicola, Florida
United States district court judges appointed by Bill Clinton